Radio X  may refer to:

 Radio X (United Kingdom), formerly known as XFM
 These stations owned by RNC Media in Quebec:
 CHOI-FM 98.1, Quebec City
 CKYK-FM 95.7, Saguenay
 CKLX-FM 91.9, Montreal
 WKPX 88.5 FM, Sunrise, Florida
 Radio X, a radio station heard in the video game Grand Theft Auto: San Andreas soundtrack

Former stations
 These stations owned by RNC Media:
 CFTX-FM 96.5, Gatineau (formerly known as Tag Radio X)
 CHGO-FM 104.3, Val-d'Or (formerly known as GO Radio X)
 CJGO-FM 102.1, La Sarre (formerly known as GO Radio X)
 DYRX 102.3 FM, Oton, Iloilo, Philippines